In Jainism, Balabhadra or Baladeva are among the sixty-three illustrious beings called śalākāpuruṣas that are said to grace every half cycle of time. According to Jain cosmology, śalākāpuruṣa are born on this earth in every Dukhama-sukhamā ara. They comprise twenty-four tīrthaṅkaras, twelve chakravartins, nine balabhadra, nine narayana, and nine pratinarayana. Their life stories are said to be most inspiring. According to the Jain puranas, the Balabhadras lead an ideal Jain life.

Nine Balabhadras 
According to the Digambaras nine Balabhadras of the present half cycle of time (avasarpini) are:

References

General references 
 
 

Salakapurusa